Mehsana Lok Sabha constituency (formerly, Mehsana Lok Sabha constituency) is one of the 26 Lok Sabha (parliamentary) constituencies in Gujarat state in western India.

Assembly segments
Presently, Mahesana Lok Sabha constituency comprises seven Vidhan Sabha (legislative assembly) segments. These are:

Members of Lok Sabha

^ by poll

Election results

2019

2014

2009

2004

1984

See also
 Mahesana district
 List of Constituencies of the Lok Sabha
 Mahesana Assembly constituency

References

Lok Sabha constituencies in Gujarat
Mehsana district